Vocobeat is the fourth studio album by the a cappella group Rockapella. It is their first all original album and marks the first full-time CD debut of Jeff Thacher as the group's vocal percussionist. This album is also the first to include the phrase "All sounds on this album were produced exclusively by the voices and body parts of Rockapella" on the CD insert.

Track listing

Personnel
Scott Leonard – high tenor
Sean Altman – tenor
Elliot Kerman – baritone
Barry Carl – bass
Jeff Thacher – vocal percussion

Special Appearances
Jaci Carl – "Fat Jack & Bonefish Joe"
Lisa Leonard – "U beat me up"
Jesse Leonard – "NYC Summa"

1990 albums
Rockapella albums